SJBP may refer to:
St. John the Baptist Parish, Louisiana
San Jose Bike Party in San Jose, California